MetroLink  is the Greater St. Louis Metropolitan mass transit system serving Missouri and the Metro East area of Illinois. The system consists of two rail lines (Red Line and Blue Line) connecting St. Louis Lambert International Airport and Shrewsbury, Missouri, with Scott Air Force Base near Shiloh, Illinois, Washington University, Forest Park, and Downtown St. Louis. The system operates as underground subway in Downtown St. Louis and as underground subway through portions near Forest Park and Clayton to the west. The system features 38 stations and is the only light rail system in the United States to cross state lines. As of the third quarter of 2020, it is second only to Minneapolis Metro Transit in the Midwestern United States in terms of light rail ridership, and is the 11th-largest light rail system in the country.

MetroLink is operated by the Bi-State Development Agency, operating as Metro since 2003, in a shared fare system with the MetroBus lines. Despite officially being called "light rail," it features many characteristics of a light metro or rapid transit service, including a completely independent right of way, a higher top speed, and all high level platforms.

History 

Construction on the initial MetroLink alignment from St. Louis Lambert International Airport to the 5th & Missouri station in East St Louis began in 1990. The initial  segment with 19 stations opened on July 31, 1993, between the North Hanley and 5th & Missouri stations. Service was operated with 31 high-floor light rail vehicles. About 14 miles of the original 17 miles were on existing rail right-of-way. The first phase of MetroLink was complete when the line was extended westward to Lambert Airport Main station on June 25, 1994. At that time another station, East Riverfront, was opened in East St. Louis. Four years later, in 1998, the Lambert Airport East station was added. The capital cost to build the initial phase of MetroLink was $465 million. Of that amount, $348 million was supplied by the Federal Transit Administration (FTA).

Construction on the St. Clair County MetroLink extension from the 5th & Missouri station to the College station in Belleville began in 1998 and opened in May 2001. The extension added eight new stations and seven park-ride lots. The total project cost was $339.2 million, with the FTA and St. Clair County Transit District sharing the burden at 72% ($243.9 million) and 28% ($95.2 million), respectively. Local funding was provided by the St. Clair County Transit District as a result of a 1/2 cent sales tax passed in November 1993.

In May 2003, a  extension from Southwestern Illinois College to Shiloh-Scott station opened. This $75 million project was funded by a $60 million grant from the Illinois FIRST (Fund for Infrastructure, Roads, Schools, and Transit) Program and $15 million from the St. Clair County Transit District.

This , 9-station extension connected Washington University, Clayton, the popular Saint Louis Galleria shopping center, Maplewood, and Shrewsbury to the system. The entire project was funded by a $430 million Metro bond issue. Metro cited repeated delays and cost overruns as its reasons for firing its general contractor in Summer 2004. Metro sued the Collaborative for $81 million for fraud and mismanagement. The Collaborative counter-sued for $17 million for work that Metrolink hadn't yet paid for. On December 1, 2007, a jury voted in favor of the Cross County Collaborative, awarding them $2.56 million for work as yet unpaid for.

On , Metro renamed the two MetroLink lines using color designations: the Lambert Airport branch was renamed to the Red Line; the Shrewsbury branch, the Blue Line. Service was also extended on the Blue Line from its former terminus at Emerson Park to Fairview Heights. All trains have a red or blue sign on the front that identify the train as a Red Line or Blue Line train, and all operators make station announcements identifying the Red Line or Blue Line.

On , the United States Department of Transportation announced $10.3 million in funding for a new Metrolink station between the Central West End and Grand stations in the Cortex research district. An additional $5 million in funding was provided by a public-private partnership including Washington University, BJC HealthCare, Great Rivers Greenway and the Cortex Innovation Community.

2022 flooding 
On July 26, 2022, the Forest Park-DeBaliviere and Delmar Loop stations were flooded in a catastrophic flash flooding event that shut the system down for close to 72 hours. Damage to the stations, rolling stock, ballast, signaling infrastructure, fiber optics, etc. is estimated to be $40 million.

On September 5, 2022, Metro announced new schedules to accommodate repairs being made to the system. It is estimated repairs could take six months or longer. Currently, both the Red and Blue Lines are operating at all stations along their routes but with restricted speeds in some flood-damaged sections. Temporarily the Blue Line operated only between the Shrewsbury-Lansdowne I-44 and Forest Park-DeBaliviere stations while repairs were made to the system. In November 2022, Metro announced the restoration of Blue Line service to its Fairview Heights terminal while repairs to the flood damaged system continue.

Chronology 
Below is a list of dates on which parts of the MetroLink system opened for service.

Current rail lines

Red Line 

The  Red Line alignment begins at Lambert St. Louis International Airport, making stops at the Terminal 1 and Terminal 2 stations. It then proceeds through Kinloch before making a stop at the North Hanley station near Bel-Ridge. It makes 2 stops (UMSL North & UMSL South) at the University of Missouri St. Louis located in Normandy. After departing UMSL, trains divert south onto the former Wabash/Norfolk & Western Railroad's Union Depot line that once brought passenger trains from Ferguson to Union Station. It then travels into Pagedale stopping at the Rock Road station and then at Wellston's namesake station on Plymouth Street. From here, the Red Line crosses the St. Louis City/County boundary line at Skinker Boulevard, making a stop at the Delmar Loop station which serves the popular Delmar Loop area and is located just below the original Wabash Railroad's Delmar Station building. At the following station, Forest Park-DeBaliviere, the Red Line meets the Blue Line. From this station the two services share a track alignment with each other until the Blue Line terminates at the Fairview Heights station in Illinois. From Fairview Heights the Red Line continues south, serving Belleville, Illinois, and then terminating at the Shiloh-Scott station at Scott Air Force Base. For the rest of the Red Line, see the "Shared Alignment" section.

Blue Line 

The 24-mile (39 km) Blue Line alignment starts in Shrewsbury, Missouri, just west of the River des Peres. It crosses over Interstate 44 and continues north to the next two stations located in Maplewood, Missouri (Sunnen and Maplewood/Manchester). The line then continues north to the Brentwood I-64 station, located in Brentwood, Missouri, just south of Interstate 64. It then proceeds in a tunnel underneath Interstate 64, continuing to the Richmond Heights station serving the popular Saint Louis Galleria shopping mall. The line then proceeds through a sharp turn east to the Clayton station in the median of Forest Park Parkway in Clayton, Missouri, where it serves the Central Business District of St. Louis County. It heads further east to the Forsyth station where it then enters a tunnel traveling to the University City-Big Bend subway station. After crossing the St. Louis City/County boundary, the Blue Line makes its last stop at the Skinker subway station serving nearby Washington University. At the following station, Forest Park-DeBaliviere, the Blue Line meets the Red Line. From this station the two services share a track alignment with each other until the Blue Line terminates at the Fairview Heights station in Illinois. For the rest of the Blue Line, see the "Shared Alignment" section.

Shared alignment 
 From the Forest Park-DeBaliviere station, the Red and Blue lines share the same set of tracks for the next 16 stations. Continuing east, the Central West End station serves the Washington University Medical Center including Barnes-Jewish and St. Louis Children's hospitals. The next station, Cortex, is the system's newest which was built to serve the Cortex Innovation Community. From here is the Grand station, located under the Grand Boulevard viaduct, which serves Saint Louis University and its namesake hospital. The Grand station also transfers with Metro's busiest bus line, the #70 (Grand). Trains then pass under the Jefferson Avenue viaduct before they enter the next stop at Union Station, located partially beneath the historic train shed at the popular St. Louis Union Station. A short distance later, trains stop at the Civic Center station and connect with the Gateway Transportation Center and Enterprise Center, home of the St. Louis Blues hockey team. Trains then continue east along Interstate 64 turning north toward the Stadium station. Stadium station serves Busch Stadium, home of the St. Louis Cardinals and the popular Ballpark Village district. Here, the line enters the historic St. Louis Freight Tunnel that was built in 1875, it was converted to light rail usage beginning in 1991. The next station is 8th & Pine, a subway station located under 8th Street serving the Central Business District. Following a curve eastward under Washington Avenue, the line then enters the Convention Center subway station serving the Dome and convention facilities at America's Center. It then makes stops on both sides of the historic Eads Bridge, first at the Laclede's Landing station and then the East Riverfront station in East St. Louis, Illinois. From there, it runs at-grade serving the 5th & Missouri, Emerson Park, Jackie Joyner-Kersee Center and Washington Park stations until the Blue Line terminates at the Fairview Heights station in Fairview Heights, Illinois. From here, Red Line trains continue until their terminus at Shiloh-Scott near Scott Air Force Base in Shiloh, Illinois.

Loop Trolley 
The Loop Trolley is a 2.2-mile (3.5 km), 10-station heritage streetcar line in that runs from City Hall in University City to the Missouri History Museum in St. Louis' Forest Park. The line travels along Delmar Bouleverd through the popular Delmar Loop district and DeBaliviere Avenue between Delmar and Forest Park. The trolley has stops at both the Forest Park-DeBaliviere and Delmar Loop MetroLink stations. On February 18, 2022, Metro Transit's board voted to take over operation of the Loop Trolley after several financial setbacks and closures. Metro reopened the Loop Trolley for operation on August 4, 2022. On August 21, 2022, the East-West Gateway Council of Governments voted to award Metro a $1.26 million grant to continue to operate the trolley on a seasonal schedule for the next several years.

Rolling stock 

MetroLink operates a fleet of 87 light-rail vehicles composed of 31 SD-400 and 56 SD-460 vehicles. Each , single articulated vehicle has 4 high platform doors per side and has a capacity of 72 seated and 106 standing passengers. The cars are powered by an electric motor which gets its electricity from a catenary wire with a 750 volt supply.

Each car has an enclosed operator cab at each end. This allows the most flexible system for managing operations, but prevents travel between cars except at stations. Each car also has separate doors for station level and track level access. In normal operations the track level doors (equipped with stairs) are unused.

The system also has two different railroad yards along the line for the storage and maintenance of light-rail vehicles: Ewing Yard is located between the Grand and Union Station stops just west of downtown St. Louis; 29th Street Yard is located between the JJK and Washington Park stops in Illinois. In October 2009, Metro had opened a paint booth facility in the Illinois railyard in East St. Louis, Illinois at a cost of $1.1 million.

As of July 2021, there are plans to replace the SD-400s and refurbish the remaining cars.

Roster information

Fares 

MetroLink uses a proof-of-payment system. Tickets can be purchased at ticket vending machines at the entrance to all stations and must be validated before boarding the train. Single ride tickets are good for up to two hours in the direction that a passenger initially boards. Some fares, such as monthly or weekly fares, do not need to be validated, but passengers must have the pass in their possession while riding and must show the pass to security personnel upon request.  Passengers may also load fares onto a Gateway Card, a multi-use smart card that can be obtained at Metro's downtown retail store.  In order to validate this fare type, passengers must tap their Gateway Card on the card reader at any validation machine before boarding.  Metro is still in the process of fully implementing the Gateway Card.  At full implementation, Metro plans to eliminate most paper passes and tickets, and passengers will be able to obtain a Gateway Card online or at any Metrolink Gateway vending machine at each station.

As part of Metro's Secure Platform Plan, centralized fare collection areas will be built at all 38 MetroLink stations. Other enhancements will include fare vending equipment, state-of-the-art cameras and security systems, and improved customer assistance initiatives. The project is projected to cost $52 million, which will be funded from a mix of federal, local, and private sector funds.

Reduced fares can be purchased by seniors ages 65+, people with disabilities, and children ages 5–12. Up to three children under 5 may ride free with a fare-paying rider. Proof of age may be requested of all people riding with reduced fares. Other types of passes, such as a Semester Pass for full-time students are also available in addition to the fares listed above.

Extensions in progress

MidAmerica Airport 
A 5.2-mile (8.4 km) expansion of the Red Line from Shiloh-Scott to MidAmerica St. Louis Airport in Mascoutah received $96 million in funding from the State of Illinois in 2019. This expansion will include a 2.6-mile double-track section, a 2.6-mile single-track section and a passenger station at the end of the alignment at MidAmerica Airport. Design work was completed in the summer of 2022 and a request for proposals was released that November. Construction on the expansion is expected to begin by March 2023 and be operational by spring 2025.

Extensions in planning

North-South MetroLink 
Northside/Southside - St. Louis City

 This 5.6-mile (9 km) expansion would serve approximately 14 stations between Grand Boulevard in North St. Louis and Chippewa Street in South St. Louis running primarily on Jefferson Avenue. Proposed frequency is 10 to 20 minutes operating between 5 a.m. and 1 a.m., 7 days a week. It would provide a fixed rail upgrade to Metro's high-volume #11 (Chippewa) and #4 (Natural Bridge) bus routes. A Locally Preferred Alternative (LPA) is expected to be selected in the fall of 2022.

St. Louis County Connector

 This extension would be a Phase II to Northside/Southside and continue from the North Grand Boulevard station along Natural Bridge Avenue toward North St. Louis County. Higher-volume bus stops further west along Metro's #4 (Natural Bridge) bus route support further expansion into North St. Louis County. Final routing, station location, etc. have yet to be determined for this segment. It is being studied by Bi-State and St. Louis County as of the summer of 2022.

The North-South corridor will not feature the rapid transit like characteristics of the Red and Blue lines and will instead be similar to other on-street light rail lines in the US, such as Houston or Phoenix, and would be separate from the rest of the rail system. Because of this, an infill station to facilitate transfers will be constructed on the Red and Blue Lines where they intersect with the new Jefferson Avenue alignment.

Previous extension proposals 
Many of these extensions were proposed when Metro released its Moving Transit Forward plan in 2010. Most are now defunct as regional leadership has said their current focus is on the City and North County corridors and not previous expansion proposals.

North-South MetroLink Corridors 
NorthSide - Downtown to Florissant Valley Community College

 This  extension would have run north from downtown St. Louis to the Florissant Valley Community College. A study for this extension was completed in 2008 and a Locally Preferred Alternative (LPA) was selected.  The LPA would have begun in downtown St. Louis, traveling west on Delmar Boulevard to Jefferson Avenue, north on Jefferson to Natural Bridge Avenue then west on Natural Bridge to Goodfellow Boulevard.  It would then travel north on Goodfellow to West Florissant Avenue and follow West Florissant to Florissant Valley Community College. See "Extensions in Planning" section for updated plans as of 2022.

SouthSide - Downtown to Bayless

 This 9 to 17-mile (14-27 km) extension would run south from downtown St. Louis to Bayless at Interstate 55. A study for this extension was completed in 2008 and an LPA selected. The LPA begins at the Gateway Transportation Center at 14th Street & Spruce Street, continues south on 14th to Chouteau Avenue, then traveling west on Chouteau to Jefferson Avenue. It would then travel south on Jefferson to Meramec Street, where it would follow the Interstate 55 right-of-way to a terminus at Bayless Ave.

Cross County Corridors 
Daniel Boone - Clayton to Maryland Heights/Westport & Chesterfield

 A study performed in 2000 recommended a new MetroLink line from Clayton, Missouri, to Westport Plaza in Maryland Heights, Missouri. The 8 to 10-mile (13-16 km) line would have run north from the Clayton station along the disused Terminal Railroad Association of St. Louis "Central Belt" right-of-way paralleling Interstate 170, then turn west to follow existing Union Pacific Railroad trackage operated by Central Midland Railway to Page Avenue where the line would have then followed Page to Westport Plaza. This proposed alignment would have added up to six stations between Clayton and Maryland Heights in the Interstate 170 and Page corridors serving Ladue, Olivette, and Overland.

 A  extension to Chesterfield would have been a potential Phase II of the Daniel Boone Corridor. The alignment would have headed west from Westport Plaza and crossed over Interstate 270 in Maryland Heights. It would have then run along the Page Avenue Extension (Highway 364) until it turned towards Creve Coeur Lake Memorial Park. It then would have headed westward to Spirit of St. Louis Airport in the Chesterfield Valley. This alignment has not been given serious consideration because of its perceived low ridership potential.

MetroNorth - Clayton to Florissant

 This  extension would have extended the current Blue Line from Clayton towards North County and into Florissant, Missouri. Like the Daniel Boone line, some of it will follow along the old Terminal Railroad Association of St. Louis "Central Belt" right-of-way paralleling I-170.

MetroSouth - Shrewsbury to Butler Hill

 This  extension would have extended the current Blue Line from its terminus in Shrewsbury, Missouri, further into South County beyond Interstates 270/255 to Butler Hill Road. An environmental impact study was completed in 2004; however, selection of an LPA was deferred due to the lack of local funding sources as well as other factors.

St. Charles County Corridor 

 Lambert Airport to St. Charles County: Possible plans to expand MetroLink 16 to 20-miles (26-32 km) from Lambert Airport northwestward to St. Charles County were abandoned after St. Charles County voters rejected a sales tax in 1996 to fund an extension; subsequently, all MetroBus service was ended. If the extension was funded, the route would have used the Old St. Charles Bridge (now demolished) as a crossing over the Missouri River to the City of St. Charles, St. Peters, and O'Fallon. It is not likely to be considered in the future as St. Charles County residents still largely oppose light rail expansion.

Madison County Corridors 

 East St. Louis to Alton/Edwardsville: A study in 2005 was performed to investigate the potential costs, ridership, and impacts of extending Metrolink into Madison County, Illinois. According to the East-West Gateway Council of Governments, there are two recommended alignments for Madison County. Both of the alignments will start from the 5th & Missouri station out of East St Louis in St. Clair County to Granite City, Collinsville, Glen Carbon, Edwardsville, East Alton, Wood River, and Alton in Madison County, Illinois 21 to 23-miles (34-37 km) away. The alignments would have split in Madison, Illinois. In order to plan any Madison County extensions, Metro will have to collaborate with Madison County Transit.

Station gallery

See also 
 Delmar Loop Trolley
 List of tram and light rail transit systems
 List of rail transit systems in the United States

References

External links 

 
 MetroLink in East St. Louis

 
Metro Transit (St. Louis)
St. Clair County Transit District
Public transportation in Greater St. Louis
Public transportation in St. Louis County, Missouri
Public transportation in St. Clair County, Illinois
Public transportation in St. Louis
1993 establishments in Illinois
1993 establishments in Missouri
Railway lines opened in 1993
Standard gauge railways in the United States
Rail in St. Louis
Light rail in Missouri
Electric railways in Missouri
Light rail in Illinois
750 V DC railway electrification